
Year 70 BC was a year of the pre-Julian Roman calendar. At the time it was known as the Year of the Consulship of Pompeius and Crassus (or, less frequently, year 684 Ab urbe condita). The denomination 70 BC for this year has been used since the early medieval period, when the Anno Domini calendar era became the prevalent method in Europe for naming years.

Events 
 By place 

 Roman Republic 
 August – In Rome, Cicero prosecutes former governor Verres; Verres exiles himself to Marseille before the trial is over.
 The office of censor is reinstated.
 Lucullus captures Sinop, then invades Armenia.

 Parthia 
 Phraates III becomes the king of Parthia.

Births 
 October 15 – Virgil, Roman poet (d. 19 BC)
 Cleopatra VII, queen of Egypt (d. 30 BC)
 Crinagoras, Greek epigrammatist (d. 18 BC)
 Gaius Maecenas, Roman politician (d. 8 BC)

Deaths 
 Mithridates I, king of Commagene
 Sanatruces (or Sanatruk), king of Parthia

References